Baghopara is a village and it is located at the Gokul union of Bogra, Bangladesh.

Populated places in Rajshahi Division